Aerobicity may refer to:
Aerobic respiration
Anaerobic respiration